Donald de Wayne "Don" Harper (June 4, 1932 – November 30, 2017) was an American diver who competed at the 1956 Summer Olympics.Grandchildren: Tristan Halliday(5 Star Ohio State football commit), Madison Halliday, and Jackson Halliday. He won a silver medal in the 3 m springboard event at the Games. Harper was born in Redwood City, California.

See also
 List of members of the International Swimming Hall of Fame

References

1932 births
2017 deaths
American male divers
American male trampolinists
Olympic silver medalists for the United States in diving
Divers at the 1956 Summer Olympics
Medalists at the 1956 Summer Olympics
Pan American Games medalists in diving
Pan American Games medalists in gymnastics
Pan American Games gold medalists for the United States
Pan American Games silver medalists for the United States
Gymnasts at the 1955 Pan American Games
Divers at the 1959 Pan American Games
Medalists at the 1955 Pan American Games
Medalists at the 1959 Pan American Games
People from Redwood City, California
20th-century American people